Juan Pablo Zeiss (born 2 August 1989) is an Argentine rugby union player who plays for the Jaguares. He also plays for the Dallas Jackals in Major League Rugby (MLR). His playing position is at prop.

On 2 January 2018, Zeiss was named in the Jaguares squad for the 2018 Super Rugby season. He previously played for the Houston SaberCats in the MLR.

References

External links
 itsrugby Profile

Jaguares (Super Rugby) players
Rugby union props
Argentine rugby union players
1989 births
Living people
Los Matreros Rugby Club players
Argentina international rugby union players
Dogos XV players
Houston SaberCats players
Dallas Jackals players